Marillyn Adams Hewson (born December 27, 1953) is an American businesswoman who served as the chairman, president and chief executive officer (CEO) of Lockheed Martin from January 2013 to June 2020. She is currently the strategic advisor to the CEO of aerospace and defense manufacturing company Lockheed Martin. On March 1, 2021, she retired as executive chairman and a board member.

Biography

Early life and education
Hewson was born in Junction City, Kansas to Warren Adams and Mary Adams. Her father died when she was nine-years-old and her mother, a former WAC, raised five siblings, then aged five to 15. Hewson credits her mother's resilience, hard work, and determination with teaching her leadership skills and wrote, in "A mother's resilience", for Politico, in 2013, that "My mother did what all great leaders do: she sparked the growth of future leaders."

She earned her Bachelor of Science degree in business administration and her Master of Arts degree in economics from the University of Alabama. She also attended the Columbia Business School and Harvard Business School executive development programs.

Career
Hewson joined the Lockheed Corporation in 1983 after 4 years as an economist at the Bureau of Labor Statistics. She has held a variety of executive positions with the company, including President and Chief Operating Officer, Executive Vice President of Lockheed Martin's Electronic Systems business area, President of Lockheed Martin Systems Integration, Executive Vice President of Global Sustainment for Lockheed Martin Aeronautics, President and General Manager of Kelly Aviation Center, L.P., and President of Lockheed Martin Logistics Services. On November 9, 2012, she was elected to Lockheed Martin's board of directors. She subsequently served as CEO from January 2013 until June 2020. She has also served on the board of directors for Sandia National Laboratories since 2010 and DuPont since 2007. During her tenure as CEO, Lockheed's stock value increased more than 300%.

In July 2015, Hewson announced Lockheed's purchase of Sikorsky Aircraft, the producers of Sikorsky UH-60 Black Hawk helicopters, giving Lockheed its own helicopter building capability. Hewson also shifted more company efforts towards building military hardware. Hewson joined the board of Johnson & Johnson in 2019.

On March 16, 2020, Lockheed announced that Hewson would become the executive chair of the board and be replaced as CEO on June 15. James Taiclet will take the lead after Hewson.

Recognition
In 2010, 2011, 2012, and 2015 she was named by Fortune magazine as one of the "50 Most Powerful Women in Business". In the September 15, 2015 issue of Fortune, Hewson was ranked 4th. In 2018, Hewson was named the most powerful woman in the business world by Fortune.

Hewson was named the 21st most powerful woman in the world by Forbes in 2014, and, in 2015, as the 20th most powerful woman in the world. In 2018, she was named the ninth most powerful woman in the world by Forbes. In 2019 she was listed as number 10.

Hewson was inducted into the 2017 edition of the Wash100 for international market focus and F-35 leadership.

In 2017, Hewson was listed at #35 on the Harvard Business Review "The Best-Performing CEOs in the World 2017" list.

Hewson was named "CEO of the Year" for 2018 by Chief Executive magazine, and was a member of the selection committee for 2019.

In 2018, Hewson was also awarded the Edison Achievement Award for her leadership and achievements in making a lasting contribution to the world of innovation.

Hewson was named one of Time magazine's 100 Most Influential People of 2019.

In 2019, Hewson received the Golden Plate Award of the American Academy of Achievement presented by General Joseph Ralston, USAF, former Supreme Allied Commander Europe.

Personal 
Hewson is married to James R. Hewson and lives in McLean, Virginia, as of 2020.

References

External links

 

Living people
Lockheed Martin people
Directors of DuPont
University of Alabama alumni
American chairpersons of corporations
American technology chief executives
American women chief executives
Columbia Business School alumni
American chief executives of manufacturing companies
Women corporate executives
People from Junction City, Kansas
1954 births
20th-century American businesspeople
20th-century American businesswomen
21st-century American businesspeople
American chief executives of Fortune 500 companies
Sandia National Laboratories people
21st-century American businesswomen